The Pac-12 Conference Softball Freshman of the Year is a college softball award given to the Pac-12 Conference's most outstanding freshman player. The award has been given annually since 1994, when it was known as the Newcomer of the Year and players in their first year in the conference, including transfers, were eligible. The conference was known as the Pacific-10 before becoming the Pac-12 in 2011.

Key

Winners

Winners by school

References

Awards established in 1994
Freshman
NCAA Division I softball conference freshmen of the year